Shane Endsley is an American trumpeter, drummer, and composer. He is a founding member of Kneebody, as well as an active leader and sideman with other New York City jazz musicians, as well as with pop and rock musicians such as Ani DiFranco and Pearl Jam.

Background  
Endsley was born in 1975 in Denver, Colorado, and studied trumpet, percussion, and composition at the Eastman School of Music, where he met the other members of Kneebody. Since then, he has toured and recorded with Ani DiFranco and Steve Coleman and has done work with Slavic Soul Party, Ralph Alessi, Tim Berne, Ravi Coltrane, John Hollenbeck and others in the downtown music and jazz scenes. He resides in Brooklyn.

Discography

As leader
 2nd Guess (Endsley Music, 2002)
 The The Other (Low Electrical Records, 2011)

As co-leader
With Kneebody
 Kneebody (Koch, 2005)
 Low Electrical Worker (Jazz Engine, 2007)
 You Can Have Your Moment (Winter & Winter, 2010)
 The Line (Concord, 2013)
 Kneedelus (Beat, 2016)
 Anti-Hero (Motema, 2017)
 Chapters (Edition, 2019)

As sideman
With Ralph Alessi
 Hissy Fit (Love Slave, 1999)
 Vice & Virtue (RKM Music, 2003)
 Anastomosi (Abeat, 2006)

With Steve Coleman
 Genesis & the Opening of the Way (RCA Victor, 1997)
 The Sonic Language of Myth (RCA Victor, 1999)
 The Ascension to Light (BMG, 2001)

With Ani DiFranco
 Revelling/Reckoning (Righteous Babe, 2001)
 So Much Shouting So Much Laughter (Righteous Babe, 2002)
 Evolve (Righteous Babe, 2003)

With others
 Ben Allison, Think Free (Palmetto, 2009)
 Asphalt Orchestra, Asphalt Orchestra (Cantaloupe Music, 2010)
 Au Revoir Simone, The Bird of Music (Our Secret, 2007)
 Jamie Baum, Solace (Sunnyside, 2008)
 David Binney, Oceanos (Criss Cross, 2007)
 Theo Bleckmann, Kneebody, Twelve Songs by Charles Ives (Winter & Winter, 2008)
 Michael Cain, Indira (ONOFF, 2005)
 Steve Cardenas, Melody in a Dream (Sunnyside, 2013)
 Ana Egge, Out Past the Lights (Grace, 2004)
 Ana Egge, Road to My Love (Grace, 2009)
 John Ellis, Mobro (Parade Light, 2014)
 John Escreet, Sabotage and Celebration (Whirlwind, 2013)
 Michael Formanek, The Distance (ECM, 2016)
 Joel Harrison, Passing Train (Tuition, 2008)
 Matt Keating, Wrong Way Home (Sojourn, 2011)
 Donny McCaslin, Soar (Sunnyside, 2006)
 Michael McGinnis, Tangents (RKM Music, 2001)
 Jason Mraz, Waiting for My Rocket to Come (Elektra, 2002)
 Todd Sickafoose, Tiny Resistors (Cryptogramophone 2008)
 Ohad Talmor, Newsreel (Auand, 2011)
 Ohad Talmor, Long Forms (Intakt, 2020)
 Kate Schutt, Telephone Game (ArtistShare, 2008)
 Slavic Soul Party!, Bigger (Barbes, 2005)
 Slavic Soul Party!, Taketron (Barbes, 2009)

References

External links 
 Discography 

Living people
Year of birth missing (living people)
Musicians from Denver
Eastman School of Music alumni
American trumpeters
American male trumpeters
American drummers
American male composers
21st-century American composers
21st-century trumpeters
21st-century American male musicians
Kneebody members